Didier Bienaimé (9 June 1961 – 7 August 2004) was a French actor.

Partial filmography
 (please expand)
  2005:  The Turkish Gambit
  2001:  "La Grand Vie!"
  1999: Joséphine, ange gardien
  1995:  "Mary of Nazareth"

External links

1961 births
2004 deaths
People from Troyes
French male film actors
French male television actors